William Pountney Wright (1893–1945) was an English professional footballer who played in the Football League for Exeter City, Huddersfield Town and Everton as a centre forward.

Personal life 
Wright served in the Merchant Navy during the First World War.

Career statistics

References

English footballers
Association football forwards
English Football League players
Exeter City F.C. players
Huddersfield Town A.F.C. players
Footballers from Liverpool
Egremont F.C. players
Everton F.C. players
South Liverpool F.C. (1890s) players
St Mirren F.C. players
Tranmere Rovers F.C. players
Mid Rhondda F.C. players
Yeovil Town F.C. players
1893 births
1945 deaths
Scottish Football League players

British Merchant Service personnel of World War I